Mustafa Pancar (born 1964) is a Turkish artist.

Early life and education
Pancar was born in Istanbul, Turkey in 1964. He graduated from the painting department of Mimar Sinan University, Faculty of Fine Arts.

Collections 
Pancar's works are held in the Istanbul Museum of Modern Art.

Exhibitions

Solo 
1994: "Sonradan Boyanmışlar", Atatürk Library, Istanbul, Turkey
2000: "Kuryenin Rüyası", Academic Art Center, Istanbul, Turkey
2002: "Karışık Hikayeler", Istanbul, Turkey
2004: "Uzaylılar – Halı Savaşları", Evin Art Gallery, Istanbul, Turkey
2006: "Serbest Pazar", Evin Art Gallery, Istanbul, Turkey
2008: "Shadow World", K4, Nuremberg, Germany
2008: "Gölge Dünya", Evin Art Gallery, Istanbul, Turkey
2010: "Tools - Human animal", Kare Art Gallery, Istanbul, Turkey
2010: "Alet Kutusu", Kullukcu, Munich, Germany

Group 
2009: "Istanbul Next Wave" Martin-Gropius-Bau, Berlin, Germany;"Culture Industry, Folklore and Clichés" VOX, Athens, Greece
2010: "Hunter video and film programme" 
2010: "Tactics of Invisibility" Tanas, Berlin, Germany 
2010: "Tactics of Invisibility" Thyssen-Bornemisza Art Contemporary, Vienna, Austria 
2010: "Hafriyat. Spare Time. Great Work." Munich, Germany 
2010: "Arter. Second Exhibition"

Further reading

References
  

1964 births
Living people
Artists from Istanbul
Mimar Sinan Fine Arts University alumni